Pak Nam Pho railway station is a railway station in the Pak Nam Pho Sub-district, Nakhon Sawan City, Nakhon Sawan. It is 250.559 km from Bangkok railway station and is a class 1 railway station. It is on the Northern Line of the State Railway of Thailand. The station opened on 31 October 1905 as part of the Northern Line extension from Lopburi to Pak Nam Pho. The line continued to Phitsanulok in 1908. Originally, this was the railway station for Nakhon Sawan City as passengers would alight here and cross the Chao Phraya River to reach the city, however its main purpose was removed as the new railway station built at Nong Pling replaced its role. Today, the station acts as a rail yard, a railway maintenance centre, and a junction for an occasionally-used freight line to Kamnansong Rice Mill.

Sub-divisions 
These are the sub-divisions within the area of Pak Nam Pho railway station:
 Pak Nam Pho Branch of Railcars Department
 Railway Medical Team Office, Pak Nam Pho District
 Railway Workers' Union, Pak Nam Pho Branch

Train services 
 Rapid 109/102 Bangkok-Chiang Mai-Bangkok
 Rapid 107/112 Bangkok-Den Chai-Bangkok
 Rapid 111/108 Bangkok-Den Chai-Bangkok
 Ordinary 201/202 Bangkok-Phitsanulok-Bangkok
 Ordinary 211/212 Bangkok-Taphan Hin-Bangkok
 Local 401/402 Lop Buri-Phitsanulok-Lop Buri
 Local 407/408 Nakhon Sawan-Chiang Mai-Nakhon Sawan

References 
 Ichirō, Kakizaki (2010). Ōkoku no tetsuro: tai tetsudō no rekishi. Kyōto: Kyōtodaigakugakujutsushuppankai. 
 Otohiro, Watanabe (2013). Tai kokutetsu yonsenkiro no tabi: shasō fūkei kanzen kiroku. Tōkyō: Bungeisha. 

Railway stations in Thailand